Glossodoris lamberti is a species of sea slug, a dorid nudibranch, a shell-less marine gastropod mollusk in the family Chromodorididae.

Distribution 
The type locality for this species is Nouméa, New Caledonia, .

References

Chromodorididae
Gastropods described in 1875